Rava-Ruska is a land border crossing between Ukraine and Poland on the Ukrainian side, near the city of Rava-Ruska, Lviv Raion, Lviv Oblast.

The crossing is situated on autoroute  Warsaw - Lviv. Across the border on the Polish side is the village of Hrebenne, Tomaszów Lubelski County, Lublin Voivodeship. In the city at a rail station is rail border checkpoint that however serves freight trains only.

The type of crossing is automobile and lorries but not pedestrians however they are planning to build a crossing for pedestrians in the future 
The port of entry is part of the Rava-Ruska customs post of Lviv customs.

See also
 Poland–Ukraine border
 State Border of Ukraine
 Highway M09 (Ukraine)

References

External links

 State Border Guard of Ukraine website 
 Пункти пропуску на кордоні із Росією — Державна прикордонна служба (English: Checkpoints on the Border with Russia) from The State Border Service website 

Geography of Lviv Oblast
Lviv Oblast
Poland–Ukraine border crossings